Francis Basset may refer to:

Francis Basset (1674–1721), MP for Mitchell
Francis Basset (1715–1769), Cornish landowner and politician
Francis Basset (1740–1802), MP for Barnstaple 1780–84
Francis Basset, 1st Baron de Dunstanville (1757–1835), his son, the first of the Barons Basset

See also
Francis Bassett (died 1645), Royalist army officer
Francis Bassett (MP), British Liberal politician
Frances Basset, 2nd Baroness Basset (1781–1855), British peeress